The Decadence of Industrial Democracies: Disbelief and Discredit, Volume 1 is a 2004 book by the French philosopher Bernard Stiegler. The French original was published by Galilée. The English translation by Daniel Ross and Suzanne Arnold was published by Polity Press in 2011. It is the first volume of a three-volume series; the second and third volumes were published in French in 2006.

Secondary literature
Tom Bunyard, Technoreformism
Daniel Ross, The Cinematic Condition of the Politico-Philosophical Future.
Daniel Ross, Politics and Aesthetics, or, Transformations of Aristotle in Bernard Stiegler.

Works by Bernard Stiegler
2004 non-fiction books
2011 non-fiction books
Philosophy books
Polity (publisher) books